Battle River is a river in central Alberta and western Saskatchewan.

Battle River may refer to:

United States 

 Battle River (Minnesota), a tributary of Red Lake in Minnesota, the United States

Canada 

 Rural Municipality of Battle River No. 438, Saskatchewan
 Battle River (electoral district), a former federal electoral district in Alberta, Canada

See also 
 Battle (disambiguation)
 Battle Creek (disambiguation)
 Battle Lake (disambiguation)
 River Battle, Dollywood amusement park ride
 Naval battle
 Battle